Gumi or GUMI may refer to:

 Gumi, Iran, a village in South Khorasan Province, Iran
 Gumi, Nepal, a village development committee in Surkhet District, Bheri Zone, Nepal
 Gumi, North Gyeongsang, a city in Gyeongsangbuk-do, South Korea
 Gumi University
 Gumi or Elaeagnus multiflora, a species of shrub or small tree native to China, Korea and Japan
 Megumi Hinata (GUMI), Japanese singer and songwriter
 The name of the Megpoid mascot from the Vocaloid franchise

See also
 
 Kumi (disambiguation)